was a renowned Japanese photographer. He was known for taking ethnographic photographs.

References

Nihon shashinka jiten / 328 Outstanding Japanese Photographers. Kyoto: Tankōsha, 2000. . 

Japanese photographers
1900 births
1974 deaths